The Melgarejo Cabinet constituted the 30th cabinet of the Republic of Bolivia. It was formed on 19 June 1867 after Mariano Melgarejo was installed as the 15th president of Bolivia following the coup d'état, succeeding the Achá Cabinet. It was dissolved on 15 January 1871 upon Melgarejo's overthrow in another coup d'état and was succeeded by the Cabinet of Agustín Morales.

Composition

History 

Upon his assumption to office, Melgarejo charged all ministerial portfolios to Mariano Donato Muñoz as secretary general pending the formation of a proper ministerial cabinet. A full council of ministers was appointed on 19 June 1867, two and a half years later, composed of four ministers. In addition to the four ministries, Muñoz was appointed to the position of head of the cabinet, a position tantamount to a prime minister, with the power to preside over the cabinet in the event of the absence of the president. On 16 February 1869, a new office, dubbed as the Ministry of Industry and Worship, was established.

Cabinets

Structural changes

References

Notes

Footnotes

Bibliography 

 

1867 establishments in Bolivia
1871 disestablishments in Bolivia
Cabinets of Bolivia
Cabinets established in 1867
Cabinets disestablished in 1871